Irakli Mosidze is a Georgian wrestler who participated at the 2010 Summer Youth Olympics in Singapore. He won the bronze medal in the boys' freestyle 63 kg event, defeating Murphy Quinton of the United States in the bronze medal match.

References 

Wrestlers at the 2010 Summer Youth Olympics
Male sport wrestlers from Georgia (country)
Living people
Year of birth missing (living people)
21st-century people from Georgia (country)